Mu'taridah is a remote mountain settlement in Fujairah, United Arab Emirates (UAE).

References 

Populated places in the Emirate of Fujairah
Villages in the United Arab Emirates